James T. Gallagher (June 9, 1904 – April 9, 2002) was a sports writer and baseball executive who served as general manager of the Chicago Cubs.

Gallagher worked as a sports writer for the Chicago Herald-American. He succeeded Charles Weber as general manager of the Cubs after the 1940 season.

References

Major League Baseball general managers
Chicago Cubs executives
1904 births
2002 deaths